Lyran is a short name for the Academic Female Voice Choir Lyran, a Finland-Swedish choir in Helsinki.

Lyran is also the adjectival or demonymic form of Lyra, a constellation. As such, it has been used in various fictional settings.

Lyrån is a Scandinavian surname.

Use in fiction
 The Lyran Star Empire, a faction in the Star Fleet Universe fictional setting
 The Lyran Alliance, a faction in the BattleTech fictional setting

People
 Hilde Lyrån, a Norwegian actress, dancer, and comedian

See also
 Lyra (disambiguation)